The 2014 WCHA Men's Ice Hockey Tournament was played between March 13 and March 22, 2014, at four conference arenas and the Van Andel Arena in Grand Rapids, Michigan. By winning the tournament, Minnesota State was awarded the Broadmoor Trophy and received the WCHA's automatic bid to the 2014 NCAA Division I Men's Ice Hockey Tournament.

Format
The first round of the postseason tournament features a best-of-three games format. The top eight or ten conference teams participate in the tournament. Teams are seeded No. 1 through No. 8 according to their final conference standing, with a tiebreaker system used to seed teams with an identical number of points accumulated. The top four seeded teams each earn home ice and host one of the lower seeded teams.

The winners of the first round series advance to the Van Andel Arena for the WCHA Final Five, a holdover from previous tournaments where it was used as the collective name of the quarterfinal, semifinal, and championship rounds. The Final Five uses a single-elimination format. Teams are re-seeded No. 1 through No. 4 according to the final regular season conference standings.

Conference standings
Note: GP = Games played; W = Wins; L = Losses; T = Ties; PTS = Points; GF = Goals For; GA = Goals Against

Bracket
Teams are reseeded after the first round

Note: * denotes overtime periods

Results

First round
All times are local.

(1) Ferris State vs. (8) Bemidji State

(2) Minnesota State vs. (7) Northern Michigan

(3) Alaska vs. (6) Alaska–Anchorage

(4) Bowling Green vs. (5) Michigan Tech

Semifinals
All times are local (UTC−4).

(2) Minnesota State vs. (4) Bowling Green

(1) Ferris State vs. (6) Alaska–Anchorage

Championship
All times are local (UTC−4).

(1) Ferris State vs. (2) Minnesota State

Tournament awards

All-Tournament Team
F Teodors Bļugers (Minnesota State)
F Bryce Gervais (Minnesota State)
F Gerald Mayhew (Ferris State)
D Austin Coldwell (Alaska-Anchorage)
D Brett Stern (Minnesota State)
G Cole Huggins* (Minnesota State)
* Most Valuable Player(s)

References

External links
Western Collegiate Hockey Association
WCHA Tournament Information

WCHA Men's Ice Hockey Tournament
WCHA Men's Ice Hockey Tournament